Will Weaver (born  1984) is an American professional basketball coach who is currently the head coach for Paris Basketball of the LNB Pro A. He previously served as an assistant coach for the Australian national basketball team.

Coaching career

Texas Longhorns (2007–2011)
Whilst completing a Bachelor of Arts at the University of Texas at Austin, Weaver started getting involved in the university's basketball program from a coaching perspective. After helping run camps at the university, he was presented with the opportunity of a role in the university's Longhorn program. When he completed his bachelor's degree, he continued onto a Master of Education and joined the Longhorns first as a graduate assistant and then as a special assistant.

Sam Houston State (2011–2013)
After completing his Master of Education, Weaver moved east to Huntsville, Texas and joined the Sam Houston State University basketball program as an assistant coach. Whilst there, he started forging connections within the basketball world, most notably with Sam Hinkie who at the time was the assistant general manager for the Houston Rockets and who would later become general manager of the Philadelphia 76ers.

Philadelphia 76ers (2013–2016)
Shortly after joining the Philadelphia 76ers and before hiring future head coach Brett Brown, Hinkie offered a job as an assistant coach to Weaver. After joining the club, Weaver initially worked as a video coordinator before becoming Brown's special assistant for his last two seasons with the club.

Brooklyn Nets (2016–2018)
After helping through the rebuilding phase the 76ers went through when Hinkie was hired, Weaver was noted as a someone with experience with rebuilding a club and running a development program and was thus hired by the Brooklyn Nets. Through his two years at the club, Weaver served as the special assistant to head coach Kenny Atkinson.

Long Island Nets (2018–2019)
After Ronald Nored, former head coach of the Nets' NBA G League affiliate club the Long Island Nets, announced he was leaving the G League club, Weaver was brought in to replace him. In his single season with the club he led them to win their conference final but were unable to win the league final against the Rio Grande Valley Vipers. After recording Long Island's best season performance since joining the League in 2016, Weaver was awarded the NBA G League Coach of the Year Award.

Sydney Kings (2019–2020)
On March 22, 2019, Weaver was announced as the new head coach of the Sydney Kings of the National Basketball League (NBL). In his first season with the club, the Kings were minor champions for the first time in over a decade and made it through to the grand final series. However, after three games the Kings indicated they did not wish to proceed due to the COVID-19 pandemic and lost the series to the Perth Wildcats.

Houston Rockets (2020–2022)
On November 30, 2020, Weaver was hired by the Houston Rockets as an assistant coach after finishing as runner-up for the Oklahoma City Thunder head coaching job.

Paris Basketball (2022–present) 
Weaver was appointed as the new head coach of Paris Basketball of the French LNB Pro A on July 22, 2022.

National Team Career
In 2014 Weaver mentioned to former head coach of the Australian national basketball team Brett Brown that he was interested in an international coaching experience, Brown connected him with his successor Andrej Lemanis who appointed him as assistant coach of the team for the 2014 FIBA World Cup. Since then he's remained with the team and has helped coach at the 2016 Olympics and at multiple other events.

References

External links
 Australiabasket.com profile
 REAL GM profile

Year of birth missing (living people)
1980s births
Living people
American expatriate basketball people in Australia
American expatriate basketball people in France
American men's basketball coaches
Basketball coaches from Texas
Brooklyn Nets assistant coaches
High school basketball coaches in Texas
Houston Rockets assistant coaches
Long Island Nets coaches
Paris Basketball coaches
People from Austin, Texas
Philadelphia 76ers coaches
Sam Houston Bearkats men's basketball coaches
Sydney Kings coaches
Texas Longhorns men's basketball coaches
University of Texas at Austin alumni